Vladislav Dmitriyevich Yarkin (born 16 April 1965) is a former Russian football player.

His brother Aleksandr and his sons Aleksandr Yarkin and Artyom Yarkin are all professional footballers.

References

1965 births
Sportspeople from Barnaul
Living people
Soviet footballers
FC Dynamo Barnaul players
CSKA Pamir Dushanbe players
Russian footballers
FC Tyumen players
Russian Premier League players
Association football forwards
FC Novokuznetsk players